The British Soap Award for Best Actor was an award presented annually by the British Soap Awards from its inception in 1999 until 2019. Alongside Best Actress, the award was voted for by the public. EastEnders was the most awarded soap in this category, with ten wins. Danny Miller is the most awarded actor, with three wins. In 2022, it was announced that the category had been replaced with the award for Best Leading Performer. The final winner of the award was Hollyoaks actor Gregory Finnegan.

Winners and nominees

Wins by soap

Wins by actor

References

Television awards for Best Actor
The British Soap Awards